World Series of Fighting Canada 2: Loiseau vs Lewis was a mixed martial arts event  held  in Edmonton, Alberta, Canada.

Background

Ryan Ford was scheduled to fight Bristol Marunde at this event for the WSOF Canadian Welterweight Championship. Ford pulled out after getting injured during training.

Results

See also 
 World Series of Fighting
 List of WSOF champions
 List of WSOF events

References

Events in Edmonton
World Series of Fighting events
2014 in mixed martial arts